The 1956 NBA World Championship Series was the championship series played at the conclusion of the 1955–56 National Basketball Association (NBA) season. The Philadelphia Warriors defeated the Fort Wayne Pistons four games to one.

Series summary

Warriors win series 4–1

Team rosters

Philadelphia Warriors

Fort Wayne Pistons

See also
1956 NBA Playoffs

References
1955-56 NBA Season Summary, basketball-reference.com. Retrieved March 29, 2014.

External links
NBA History

Finals
National Basketball Association Finals
NBA
NBA
March 1956 sports events in the United States
April 1956 sports events in the United States
Basketball competitions in Philadelphia
Basketball competitions in Indiana
1956 in sports in Indiana
1956 in sports in Pennsylvania
1950s in Philadelphia
Sports in Fort Wayne, Indiana